The Solothurn Thaler was a coin equivalent to the French silver écu issued by the Swiss canton of Solothurn until 1798. It contained 26.67 g fine silver and was valued at 4 livres.

The currency of Solothurn was the livre (later franc or frank), divided into 10 batzen or 40 kreuzer.

The écu was also equivalent to 4 Franken of the Helvetic Republic, and afterwards to 4 Solothurn franken.

Coins

References

External links
 

Modern obsolete currencies
Currencies of Switzerland
1798 disestablishments
Canton of Solothurn